The Revenge of Baccarat (French: La revanche de Baccarat) is a 1948 French-Italian historical thriller film directed by Jacques de Baroncelli and starring Pierre Brasseur, Sophie Desmarets and Lucien Nat. It portrays the adventures of the popular character Rocambole. It was a sequel to the film Rocambole (1948). It was the director's final film of a lengthy career.

The film was shot at the Scalera Studios in Rome with sets designed by the art directors René Moulaert and Ottavio Scotti. The film's costume were designed by Marcel Escoffier.

Main cast
 Pierre Brasseur as Joseph Flippart dit 'Rocambole'  
 Sophie Desmarets as La comtesse Artoff dite 'Baccarat' 
 Lucien Nat as Andrea  
 Robert Arnoux as Ventura  
 Loredana as Carmen de Montevecchio  
 Roland Armontel as Le comte Artoff  
 Marcel Delaître as Le docteur Blanche / il dottore Blanche  
 Carla Candiani as Fanny  
 Vittorio Sanipoli as Arnaud, comte de Chamery  
 Ernesto Sabbatini as Le marquis de Montevecchio  
 Ginette Roy as Cerise

References

Bibliography 
 Dayna Oscherwitz & MaryEllen Higgins. The A to Z of French Cinema. Scarecrow Press, 2009.

External links 
 

1948 films
1940s French-language films
Films directed by Jacques de Baroncelli
Films shot at Scalera Studios
Films set in the 19th century
French historical thriller films
Italian historical thriller films
1940s historical thriller films
Films based on French novels
French sequel films
Italian sequel films
Italian black-and-white films
French black-and-white films
Films scored by Renzo Rossellini
1940s French films
1940s Italian films